Miles Davis at Peacock Alley is an unauthorized bootleg album by jazz musician Miles Davis. It was recorded in a two-part broadcast on KXLW-AM on July 14 and July 21, 1956, from Peacock Alley in the Gaslight Square entertainment district of St. Louis. The sessions were hosted by Spider Burks, a local DJ who championed jazz, and was also one of St. Louis’ first black disc jockeys.

Track listing
Original CD release Miles Davis at Peacock Alley

Disc 1 (recorded July 14, 1956):
 "Intro" (0:41)
 "Ah-Leu-Cha" (Charlie Parker) - 5:53
 "A Foggy Day" (George Gershwin, Ira Gershwin) - 5:19
 "All of You" (Cole Porter) - 6:35
 "Woody ‘n’ You" (Dizzy Gillespie) - 5:13
 "Walkin’" 7:27

Disc 2 (recorded July 21, 1956):
 "Two Bass Hit" (Dizzy Gillespie, John Lewis) - 5:16
 "Well You Needn't" (Thelonious Monk) - 7:39
 "Billy Boy" (Traditional) - 4:23
 "All of You" (Cole Porter) - 11:03
 "Airegin" (Sonny Rollins) - 6:07
 "Newk #2/Theme" (Miles Davis) - 7:01
 "The Theme" (Miles Davis) - 1:17

Personnel
 Miles Davis — trumpet
 John Coltrane — tenor saxophone
 Red Garland — piano
 Paul Chambers — bass
 Philly Joe Jones — drums

Miles Davis live albums
1956 live albums